The 1901 Scottish Cup Final was played on 6 April 1901 at Ibrox Stadium in Glasgow and was the final of the 29th season of the Scottish Cup. Heart of Midlothian and Celtic contested the match. Hearts won the match 4–3, thanks to goals from Bobby Walker, Charles Thomson and a double from Mark Bell.

Hearts went on to play in and win the 1901–02 World Championship, beating Tottenham Hotspur.

Final

Teams

See also
Played between same clubs:
1907 Scottish Cup Final
1956 Scottish Cup Final
2019 Scottish Cup Final
2020 Scottish Cup Final

References
 RSSSF: Scottish Cup 1900–01
 Scottish Football Archive

1901
Cup Final
Scottish Cup Final 1901
Scottish Cup Final 1901
1900s in Glasgow